The ABA League Top Prospect award, also known as the Adriatic League Top Prospect award, is an annual award given by the Adriatic League (ABA League), which is a European regional league, that is the top-tier level professional basketball league for clubs from the Former Yugoslavia. The award is given to the league's best young player, aged 22 and under.  The inaugural award was given out in the 2013–14 ABA League season.

Award winners

See also
EuroLeague Rising Star

References

External links
 Adriatic ABA League official website
 Adriatic ABA League page at Eurobasket.com

Top Prospect